Incheba (Expo) (formerly stylized as Incheba €XPO) is a congress and exposition centre located in the Petržalka borough of Bratislava, Slovakia, just near Nový Most bridge.

It includes multi-use exhibition halls, a parking lot with 4,500 places, a main building 85.6 meters high and the Hotel Incheba.

The fair program is oriented to areas such as construction, tourism, gastronomy, chemical industry, automobile industry, cosmetics, fashion, medical equipment and arts. The Coneco, Incheba, Slovmedica and Slovfarma fairs have been included in the  calendar. It is also used for events such as concerts, conferences and tournaments. In 2006, more than a million people visited Incheba, of which 700,000 came to a total of 49 expositions, shows and fairs and 338,000 to other events.

External links 
 Incheba

Convention centers in Slovakia
Buildings and structures in Bratislava
Buildings and structures completed in 1967